Juan de Castellanos (March 9, 1522 – November 1606) was a Spanish poet, soldier and Catholic priest who lived in the New Kingdom of Granada. As one of the early Spanish chroniclers he has contributed to the knowledge of the indigenous peoples of the Americas, mainly the Muisca.

Biography 
De Castellanos was born in Alanís, Sevilla, Spain. He travelled to America before 1545 as a cavalry soldier, and acquired some property on Cubagua island in the Pearl Coast. Abandoning the military profession, he became a secular priest in Cartagena and, declining the positions of canon and treasurer, went as curate to Tunja. There he composed his epic poem, Elegías de varones ilustres de Indias, the first part of which appeared in Madrid in 1588, and the first three parts in 1837. It is the longest poem ever in the Spanish language: 113,609 verses. The Lenox Branch of the New York Public Library possesses a complete copy. The verse recounts successively the deeds of prominent Spaniards in America, beginning with Christopher Columbus, and is an interesting source for the colonial history of northern South America, including many details of ethnography and ethnology.

De Castellanos was among the earliest conquistadores and was acquainted with nearly every prominent leader of the time. He relies to some extent upon Oviedo for many details, stating that Oviedo communicated to him verbally what he knew by personal experience of the settlement at Cartagena. Castellanos' poem is the second of a series of epic compositions in Spanish treating of the early colonization of America, Ercilla's La Araucana being the earliest in date of publication.

De Castellanos died in Tunja, Boyacá, New Kingdom of Granada in 1606.

Trivia 
 A university in Tunja, the Fundación Universitaria Juan de Castellanos, is named in honour of Juan de Castellanos.

See also 
 Elegías de varones ilustres de Indias

References 

16th-century Colombian poets
Colombian male poets
Muisca scholars
1522 births
1606 deaths
Epic poets